Teriomima micra, the minute buff, is a butterfly in the family Lycaenidae. It is found along the coast of Kenya and in Tanzania (from the coast to the northern part of the country). The habitat consists of coastal forests.

The larvae feed on tree lichens.

References

Butterflies described in 1898
Poritiinae
Butterflies of Africa
Taxa named by Henley Grose-Smith